Magic Music Visuals is a music visualizer and VJ software application for Windows and macOS.

Features
Magic can be used to create live visuals for music performances, or to create music videos for recorded songs.

It has a modular interface which allows for the manipulation of many different types of media, such as images, 3D models, video files, live video capture, GLSL shaders, and generative geometric graphics.  Nearly all editable parameters can be driven by multi-channel audio or MIDI input.

History
Magic is developed by Color & Music, LLC.  The company was established in 2012, and is located in Los Angeles, California.

References

Live video software
Music visualization software
Windows multimedia software
MacOS multimedia software